Ingo Naujoks is a German actor. He was born on 1 March 1962 in Bochum, West Germany.

He won the German Comedy Award for his performance in the TV series Bewegte Männer. He is also known for his performance in Rick And Olli.

He is also the actor who once portrayed Rufus, the human Grouch on Sesamstrasse, the German version of Sesame Street.

External links 
 

1962 births
Living people
People from Bochum
German male film actors
German male television actors
20th-century German male actors
21st-century German male actors